Per Åslund (born August 21, 1986) is a Swedish professional ice hockey forward for Färjestad BK of the Swedish Hockey League (SHL).

Playing career
He has spent the majority of his professional career in his native Sweden with Färjestad BK. After 446 SHL games with Färjestad, Åslund left Sweden to sign a one-year contract in Germany, with Kölner Haie of the Deutsche Eishockey Liga (DEL) on March 23, 2015. In the 2015–16 season, Åslund appeared in 47 games with Kölner Haie, contributing with seven goals and 17 points.

On April 19, 2016, Åslund opted to return to Färjestad BK, signing a two-year contract to resume his SHL career.

Awards and honours

References

External links
 

1986 births
Living people
Färjestad BK players
Kölner Haie players
Swedish ice hockey forwards